Bradley William Muster (born April 11, 1965) is a former American football fullback. He played college football at Stanford. He was selected in the 1st round (23rd overall) of the 1988 NFL Draft by the Chicago Bears.

College career
Muster attended San Marin High School in Novato, California, graduating in 1983. He later attended Stanford University. In the 1984 Big Game, Muster ran the ball for 204 yards on 34 carries. He had 78 receptions in the 1985 season, which is tied for third place in the Pacific-10 Conference. Muster graduated from Stanford in 1988 and was drafted by the Chicago Bears in the first round of the 1988 NFL Draft.

Professional career
He was used as a fullback, and his goal when he didn't have the ball was to help block for Neal Anderson. After the 1992 season, coach Dave Wannstedt would not let Muster be a featured back, so he signed a free agent contract with the Saints. The man he replaced, Craig Heyward, ended up playing with the Bears. Muster retired after the 1994 season due to nagging injuries.

Personal
Brad Muster lives in Sonoma County with his wife, son, and daughter. He is an assistant coach for the men's golf team at Santa Rosa Junior College in Santa Rosa, California.

References

1965 births
Living people
All-American college football players
American football fullbacks
Chicago Bears players
New Orleans Saints players
People from Novato, California
Stanford Cardinal football players
Players of American football from California
Sportspeople from the San Francisco Bay Area